Horg is a former municipality in the old Sør-Trøndelag county, Norway. The  municipality existed from 1841 until its dissolution in 1964. The municipality of Horg encompassed the southern part of what is now the municipality of Melhus in Trøndelag county. The municipality included areas on both sides of the river Gaula. The administrative centre was the village of Lundamo. The main church for the municipality was Horg Church.

History

The municipality of Horg was established as a municipality in 1841 when the old municipality of Støren was divided into Horg, Støren, and Soknedal. The initial population of the new municipality of Horg was 2,374. During the 1960s, there were many municipal mergers across Norway due to the work of the Schei Committee. During the 1960s, there were many municipal mergers across Norway due to the work of the Schei Committee. On 1 January 1964, the neighboring municipalities of Hølonda (population: 1,428), Horg (population: 2,560), Flå (population: 843), Melhus (population: 3,978), and the Langørgen farm (population: 11) in Buvik were all merged to form a new, larger municipality of Melhus.

Name
The municipality (originally the parish) is named after the old Horg farm since the first Horg Church was built there. The name comes from the word  which is the name for an "altar" or "cairn", so the site was likely an important site for the Old Norse religion.

Government
While it existed, this municipality was responsible for primary education (through 10th grade), outpatient health services, senior citizen services, unemployment, social services, zoning, economic development, and municipal roads. During its existence, this municipality was governed by a municipal council of elected representatives, which in turn elected a mayor.

Mayors
The mayors of Horg:

 1840–1842: Ole Hegge Knoff
 1843-1845: unknown
 1846–1849: Peder Olsen Lind
 1850-1855: N. Nordtømme
 1856–1860: Angrim M. Gylland
 1861-1861: Ole Pedersen Krogstad
 1862–1863: Esten Arntsen Solberg
 1864–1867: Peder Olsen Lind
 1868–1869: Ingebrigt Nilsen Kjelstad
 1870–1881: Angrim M. Gylland (H)
 1882–1895: Arnt Johnsen Einum (V)
 1896–1897: Halvor O. Midttømme 
 1898–1901: Arnt Johnsen Einum (V)
 1902–1913: Ole Asbjørnsen Løhre (H)
 1914–1922: Erik Midttømme (V)
 1923–1925: John Busklein (Bp)
 1926–1932: Rolf Midttømme (Bp)
 1933-1833: Peder E. Esphaug (V)
 1934-1934: John Busklein (Bp)
 1935–1937: Iver Olsen Foss (Ap)
 1938-1938: Mikkel Myklegård (Ap)
 1939–1940: Arnt Moen (Ap)
 1941–1945: Knut Røe (NS)
 1945–1947: Arnt Moen (Ap)
 1948–1951: John Buseth (Ap)
 1952–1959: Johannes Lium (Ap)
 1960–1963: Martin Bergum (Ap)

Municipal council
The municipal council  of Horg was made up of 17 representatives that were elected to four year terms. The party breakdown of the final municipal council was as follows:

See also
List of former municipalities of Norway

References

Melhus
Former municipalities of Norway
1841 establishments in Norway
1964 disestablishments in Norway